Mesocopsis is a monotypic moth genus of the family Noctuidae described by Warren in 1913. Its only species, Mesocopsis posticata, was first described by Francis Walker in 1866. It is found in Borneo.

References

Acontiinae
Monotypic moth genera